Solto Collina is a comune (municipality) in the Province of Bergamo in the Italian region of Lombardy, located about  northeast of Milan and about  northeast of Bergamo.  

Solto Collina borders the following municipalities: Castro, Endine Gaiano, Fonteno, Pianico, Pisogne, Riva di Solto, Sovere.

References